Slovakia is a landlocked country in Central Europe. The capital and largest city is Bratislava. The official language is Slovak.

Slovakia is a high-income advanced economy with a very high Human Development Index, a very high standard of living and performs favourably in measurements of civil liberties, press freedom, internet freedom, democratic governance and peacefulness. The country maintains a combination of market economy with universal health care and a comprehensive social security system. The country joined the European Union in 2004 and the Eurozone on 1 January 2009. Slovakia is also a member of the Schengen Area, NATO, the United Nations, the OECD, the WTO, CERN, the OSCE, the Council of Europe and the Visegrád Group. The Slovak economy is one of the fastest-growing economies in Europe and 3rd fastest in eurozone. Its legal tender, the Euro, is the world's 2nd most traded currency. Although regional income inequality is high, 90% of citizens own their homes. In 2016, Slovak citizens had visa-free or visa-on-arrival access to 165 countries and territories, ranking the Slovak passport 11th in the world. Slovakia is the world's biggest per-capita car producer with a total of 1,040,000 cars manufactured in the country in 2016 alone. The car industry represents 43 percent of Slovakia's industrial output, and a quarter of its exports.

For further information on the types of business entities in this country and their abbreviations, see "Business entities in Slovakia".

Notable firms 
This list includes notable companies with primary headquarters located in the country. The industry and sector follow the Industry Classification Benchmark taxonomy. Organizations which have ceased operations are included and noted as defunct.

See also 
 Economy of Slovakia
 List of banks in Slovakia

References 

Slovakia